The PWP Heavyweight Championship is a professional wrestling championship owned by Pro Wrestling Pride. It was the second championship incorporated by Pro Wrestling Pride; behind the PWP Catch Division Championship. As the companies main championship, it is usually competed for in the main event of each show.

The Championship was established on the companies 5th show, in Teignmouth, Devon in the main event. Chris Andrews would become the first champion, in a four-way match for the championship; defeating 'Wild Boar' Mike Hitchman, PJ Jones & The UK Dominator.

PWP Heavyweight Wrestling
Unlike the catch division championship, the Heavyweight championship in Pro Wrestling Pride is designed to be fought over by heavyweight wrestlers, rather than the no-limits PWP Catch Division Championship. This is suggested by the lightest wrestler to hold the championship – PJ Jones weighing in at 211 lbs, and the heaviest being Steve Griffiths at 305lbs.

It is also unusual for the championship to be defended in gimmick matches, unlike other championships. The belt is usually contested under regular match rules; with the only exceptions being best two out of three falls matches, a lumberjack match, and a loser leaves town match. Certain tournaments in Pro Wrestling Pride win number one contendership for the championship, including the Prizefighters tournament, and the King of Christmas Rumble winner. To date, only Steve Griffiths has won the championship this way.

Since its inception, the championship has been challenged for by likes of James Storm, Hardcore Holly, Rhyno and Billy Gunn.

Unlike the catch division championship (trophy), and the tag team championships (medallions), the heavyweight championship has always been represented as a traditional championship belt.

Title History 
The full history of the championship is listed below. As the championship is currently on hiatus; the current championship reign of Bram is being accumulated; however, it may not be accurate.

Championship Lineage

Combined reigns 
The total list of combined championship days held.

Triple Crown Champion
In professional wrestling, a triple crown champion is a wrestler that has won three of a promotions championships; specifically, a world championship, secondary singles championship and tag team championship. To date, only one wrestler has won the PWP Heavyweight, PWP Catch & PWP tag team Championships – Ultimo Tiger, "completing" the triple crown with his win of the Heavyweight Championship in December 2016. He had previously won the other two championships in 2014, winning the tag team championships with his 'Wrestling Time' partner Darren Saviour.

See also
 Professional Wrestling
 List of professional wrestling promotions in the Great Britain and Ireland
 Pro Wrestling Pride

References

External links 
 Pro Wrestling Pride official website
 PWP Heavyweight Championship Profile – Cagematch
 wrestling-titles.com

Professional wrestling in the United Kingdom
Professional wrestling champion lists
Heavyweight wrestling championships